Alene S. Ammond (April 6, 1933 – June 4, 2019) was an American politician who served in the New Jersey Senate from the 6th Legislative District from 1974 to 1978. Known as the "Terror of Trenton," she campaigned on and remained committed to the promise to bring anything of public interest to the public's attention.

Biography
Ammond was born in 1933 in Jackson Heights, Queens. An attendee of Pace College and Hunter College, she worked as a ballet dancer in New York City while in college. She married Harold J. Ammond in 1957; they had two daughters and one son.

Ammond's first foray into the political sphere was as New Jersey's first registered "public interest lobbyist" on behalf of her group dedicated to acting on behalf of Cherry Hill citizens, "The Cherry Hill League". In the beginning, the League made rising property taxes their primary focus. When the mayor made a passing remark that the tax increases should be blamed on "the guys who don't pay up", Ammond and the Cherry Hill League turned their attention to tax-delinquent individuals and corporations. Within one week of Ammond exposing a list of corporations behind in municipal taxes, two-thirds of the outstanding accounts - around $700,000 - were paid in full.

She was an ardent proponent of civic activism, encouraging others to "overcome the corruption that is paralyzing the proper functioning of government."

In 1967, she ran unsuccessfully for a seat on the Cherry Hill township council. However, she was part of a slate of the Camden County Democratic chair's 1973 primary ticket for the State Senate in the newly formed 6th district. She defeated her opponent in the June 1973 Democratic primary, John Jehr, by about 500 votes out of over 8,000 cast and then defeated incumbent Republican Senator John L. Miller 53%-47%.

While in the Senate, she wrote a column for Family Circle Magazine based on her previous experience in public interest lobbying. Ammond was vocal in opposition to the machine politics of South Jersey and of the New Jersey Legislature in general. For example, she used senatorial courtesy to block the appointment of a new Camden County prosecutor and clash with Senate President Frank J. Dodd. In January 1975, she was evicted from the Senate Democratic caucus for sharing secret caucus deliberations and charging that certain legislators were acting in their own interests, rather than in the interest of their constituents. She went to Federal court, where Judge Mitchell H. Cohen upheld her charge that the ousting violated her First Amendment rights and ordered she be readmitted to the caucus. She returned to the caucus to her colleagues' dismay. When one senator publicly told her, "You're not part of the team," she replied: "I have no intention of being part of your team, Senator. I don't like what it stands for. Besides, I have another team outside."

She was defeated in the 1977 Democratic primary election by party-backed former Cherry Hill councilman Victor Pachter (who would be defeated by Republican Lee Laskin in the general election). In 1980, she ran in the Democratic primary for the 6th congressional district but placed third out of three candidates. In the 1993 New Jersey gubernatorial election, Ammond ran as a third-party candidate under the party name "For the People." She placed eighth out of 19 candidates, receiving 0.13% of the vote. In 2002, she ran as the Republican nominee for mayor of Cherry Hill but was defeated by Bernie Platt.

Ammond later moved to Voorhees Township, New Jersey. She died June 4, 2019 at the University of Vermont Medical Center from complications of pneumonia.

References

1933 births
2019 deaths
Democratic Party New Jersey state senators
Women state legislators in New Jersey
People from Jackson Heights, Queens
Politicians from New York City
Politicians from Cherry Hill, New Jersey
People from Voorhees Township, New Jersey
Hunter College alumni
Pace University alumni
20th-century American women
20th-century American women politicians
20th-century American politicians
21st-century American women